Michael Pezzetta (born March 13, 1998) is a Canadian professional ice hockey forward currently playing for the Montreal Canadiens of the National Hockey League (NHL). Pezzetta was selected by the Canadiens with the 160th overall pick in the 2016 NHL Entry Draft.

Playing career 
Originally selected 11th Overall by the Sudbury Wolves in the 2014 OHL Priority Selection, Pezzetta made his OHL debut during the 2014-15 season. On January 9, 2018, during his overage season with Sudbury, Pezzetta was traded to the Sarnia Sting.
Pezzetta signed an entry-level contract with the Montreal Canadiens on March 7, 2018 and would make his professional debut during the 2018–19 season with the Laval Rocket.

During the  season, on November 1, 2021, Pezzetta was recalled by the Montreal Canadiens and made his NHL debut the following night versus the Detroit Red Wings. In his rookie season with the Canadiens, Pezzetta collected 5 goals and 6 assists in 51 games for 11 points, and led the team in penalty minutes with 81.

On July 11th, it was announced that Pezzetta would sign a one-year $750,000 to remain with the Canadiens

Career statistics

Regular season and playoffs

International

References

External links
 

1998 births
Living people
Canadian ice hockey left wingers
Canadian people of Italian descent
Laval Rocket players
Maine Mariners (ECHL) players
Montreal Canadiens draft picks
Montreal Canadiens players
Ice hockey people from Ontario
Sarnia Sting players
Sudbury Wolves players